James William Slessor Marr (9 December 1902 – 30 April 1965) was a Scottish marine biologist and polar explorer. He was leader of the World War 2 British Antarctic Expedition Operation Tabarin during its first year, 1943–1945.

Biography
Marr was born in Cushnie, Aberdeenshire, Scotland, on 9 December 1902. Son of farmer John George Marr and Georgina Sutherland Slessor. While studying classics and zoology at the University of Aberdeen, he and Norman Mooney were selected among thousands of Boy Scout volunteers to accompany Sir Ernest Shackleton on the Shackleton–Rowett Expedition in 1921, on board the vessel Quest. The expedition failed to reach its final objective the Weddell Sea due to Shackleton's death on 5 January 1922. Upon his return Marr completed his MA in classics and BSc in zoology. In between he had to participate in fund raising events that were organised in order to cover the expedition's debts. Which included standing in scout uniform outside cinemas where the film Quest was being shown. Marr spent 1926 as a Carnegie Scholar at a marine laboratory in Aberdeen. He took part in the British Australian and New Zealand Antarctic Research Expedition (BANZARE) with Sir Douglas Mawson. He went on to become a marine biologist, taking part in the Discovery Investigations (1928–1929, 1931–1933 and 1935–1937) specializing in Antarctic Krill.

In 1943, during World War II, Lieutenant Marr was promoted to Lieutenant Commander on appointment as expedition leader of Operation Tabarin. This was a secret British Antarctic Expedition launched in 1943 with the intent of establishing permanently occupied bases, thus solidifying British claims to the region. Marr led the overwintering team at Port Lockroy in 1944 but resigned in December due to poor health. In 1949, he joined the National Institute of Oceanography as a Senior Scientific Officer working there until his death on 30 April 1965. His 460-page work Natural History and Geography of Antarctic Krill was published three years after his death.

Honours and awards
1936 - W. S. Bruce Medal - for his work in the southern ocean and more particularly for his monograph on the South Orkney Islands
7 October 1941 - Clasp to the Polar Medal (Bronze) - for good services between years 1925–1939, in the Royal Research Ships "Discovery II" and "William Scoresby": James William Sleesor Marr, Esq., M.A., BSc (now Temporary Lieutenant, R.N.V.R.), H.M. Ships Discovery II and William Scoresby.
30 November 1954 - Polar Medal - For good services with the Falkland Islands Dependencies Survey in Antarctic expeditions: Temporary Lieutenant-Commander James William Slessor Marr, R.N.V.R., Base Leader, Port Lockroy, 1944.

Mount Marr, in Antarctica, was discovered in January 1930 during the course of BANZARE and subsequently named after Marr.

Marr Bay, on Laurie Island, South Orkney Islands was named in Marr's honour in 1933 by members of the Discovery Investigations.

See also
Scouting in the Antarctic
Operation Tabarin
Paul Siple

References

Sources

Further reading
 
  Includes the 4 bases established during Tabarin: Base A, Port Lockroy; Base B, Deception Island; Base C, Coronation Island; Base D, Hope Bay.
 
 
 
 
 
 
 
 
  Information booklet produced for 50th anniversary.
 
 
  Includes articles by several expedition members.

External links
 James Marr, Into The Frozen South (1923)
 
 British Antarctic Oral History Project - Includes interviews with Operation Tabarin members Marchesi, Taylor, Back, Davies, Farrington and George James (wireless operator HMS William Scoresby), all of whom speak about Marr.
 British Antarctic Survey - British scientific organisation that originated from Operation Tabarin. The Archives holds official expedition records, photographs and moving film.

Explorers of Antarctica
Recipients of the Polar Medal
Scottish marine biologists
Alumni of the University of Aberdeen
1902 births
1965 deaths
Scottish biologists
Scottish explorers
People from Aberdeenshire
Royal Naval Volunteer Reserve personnel of World War II
Royal Navy officers of World War II
Military history of the Falkland Islands in World War II
20th-century British zoologists